Mike Pelanconi, better known under his record name Prince Fatty, is a British sound engineer and record producer.

Origin of Prince Fatty 

In 2005, the clothing company Stüssy put together a line inspired by the vivid, rootsy styles of Jamaica to commemorate their 25th anniversary, and looked to create a limited-edition single to complement it.

Inspired by the optimistic, laidback vibe of Jamaica in the early 1970s, Pelanconi was part of a group created by Nasser Bouzida and Trevor Harding of Big Boss Man called "Prince Fatty," meant as a tongue-in-cheek reference to King Tubby. The instrumental track they wrote and played, "Nina's Dance," was unexpectedly successful, getting airplay on BBC Radio 1.  Following its success, Prince Fatty decided to create an album length homage to what he considered one of the most vibrant eras in Jamaican music.

Survival of the Fattest 

Subsequently, Pelanconi co-opted the name for a second Prince Fatty album called Survival of the Fattest, assembling a "supergroup" of reggae greats, including afrobeat saxophonist Bukky Leo, drummer Style Scott from the Roots Radics, Nostalgia 77's horn section, and Hammond organ by Bubblers from Ruff Cut Band. Guest vocals were provided by Hollie Cook, singer from The Slits and daughter of former Sex Pistols drummer Paul Cook, as well as Winston Francis, and  Little Roy.

The album was recorded on vintage analogue equipment to preserve the signature sound of reggae and dub records. Pelanconi also strove to update the sound by speeding up tempos and attempting to push the boundaries of classic dub and reggae by referencing the modern influences of hip-hop (especially evident in the cover of Dr. Dre and Snoop Dogg's  "Gin and Juice", as well as Ol' Dirty Bastard's "Shimmy Shimmy Ya").

Super Size 

This was followed in 2010 with Super Size, featuring vocals from Little Roy, Dennis Alcapone, Natty and Winston Francis.

On 6 September 2011, in association with the Mutant HiFi, 'Prince Fatty and the Mutant HiFi's Online Dub Service' was launched on Facebook, offering people an easy way to get dubs from the studio by sending their tracks to receive the 'Heavyweight Dub Treatment'.

Prince Fatty vs The Drunken Gambler 

His 2012 album Prince Fatty Versus the Drunken Gambler included a guest appearance from Dennis Alcapone.

Use of technology 

Prince Fatty is noted for his use of interesting and often analogue studio equipment. In an interview with audio and music publication MusicnGear  Pelanconi said that the primary DAW he works in is ProTools; stating 'I love the vari-speed function as it works like a tape machine - speeding music up and down can yield interesting results'. He also said that his favorite plugins so far are SSL plugins.

Collaborators 

Prince Fatty has often collaborated with, or produced, other artists, including Horseman, Bubblers from the Ruff Cut band, Shniece, Hollie Cook, Mutant Hi-Fi, Mungo's Hifi and Stick Figure.

Discography

Albums 
 The Best of Prince Fatty (2005), Anvil
 Survival of the Fattest (2007) Mr Bongo, (2008), Rasa Music
 Supersize (Mr Bongo, 2010), Mr Bongo
 Return of Gringo! (2011), Mr Bongo
 Prince Fatty Versus the Drunken Gambler (2012), Mr Bongo
 Prince Fatty vs. Mungo's Hi-Fi  (2014), Mr Bongo
 In The Viper's Shadow  (2019), Evergreen

Singles 

 Nina’s Dance — 7″ (Stussy, 2006)
 Milk & Honey ft. Hollie Cook — 7″/CD/MP3 (Mr Bongo, 2007)
 Milk & Honey 100% Dubstepper vs Moodyboyz — 12″/MP3 (Mr Bongo, 2007)
 Scorpio / Roof Over My Head — 7″/MP3 (Mr Bongo, 2008)
 Shimmy Shimmy Ya / Gin & Juice — 7″/MP3 (Mr Bongo, 2009)
 Insane In The Brain — 7″/MP3 (Mr Bongo, 2010)
 Christopher Columbus ft. Little Roy / Dry Your Tears ft. Winston Francis — 7″ (Mr Bongo, 2010)
 Sliver/Dive ft. Little Roy (covers of Nirvana songs) - 7" (ARK, 2011)
 Black Rabbit with Shniece McMenamin ( A cover of White Rabbit by Jefferson Airplane ) (Evergreen Recordings 2020)

References

External links 

 
 

Year of birth missing (living people)
Living people
British audio engineers
British record producers
Dub musicians
British reggae musicians
Musicians from London
Mr Bongo Records artists
Place of birth missing (living people)